Taking the piss is a colloquial term meaning to mock at the expense of others, or to be joking, without the element of offence. It is also sometimes phrased as a question, 'are they taking the piss?', when referring to an individual who takes above and beyond what is thought acceptable, similar to the expression, 'give them an inch and they take a mile. It is a shortening of the idiom taking the piss out of, which is an expression meaning to mock, tease, joke, ridicule, or scoff. It is not to be confused with "taking a piss", which refers to the act of urinating. Taking the Mickey (Mickey Bliss, Cockney rhyming slang), taking the Mick or taking the Michael are additional terms for making fun of someone. These terms are most often used in the United Kingdom, Ireland, South Africa, New Zealand and Australia.

Usage
The term sometimes refers to a form of mockery in which the mocker exaggerates the other person's characteristics; pretending to take on his or her attitudes, etc., for the purpose of comedic effect at the expense of another. This would be described as "taking the piss" out of that person, or "a piss-take". It may also be used to refer to a ruse whereby a person is led to believe a plainly unbelievable fact for the purpose of ridicule of the subject, e.g. "Are you being serious?" "No, I'm just taking the piss."

The phrase is in common usage throughout British society and to a lesser extent in Irish society, employed by headline writers in broadsheet gazettes and tabloids as well as colloquially. It is also used in English-speaking countries such as Australia.

In colloquial usage, "taking the piss" is also used to refer to someone or something that makes a claim which is not in line with a recognised agreement, e.g. an invoice that is double the quoted price with no explanation for the added charge could be said to "take the piss", or likewise if something consistently misses a deadline.

The term can also mean to take unfair advantage; for example, if someone has a food buffet and one guest clearly takes more than his expected share.  It can also relate to an abuse of trust, such as "You can use my 'phone, but don't take the piss!", i.e., do not abuse my offer of assistance by making lengthy calls that will cost me a lot of money.  Equally, a wilfully unproductive employee could be described as "taking the piss" for accepting a wage while knowingly failing to deliver on their obligation, or an employer could be accused of "taking the piss" for making unreasonable requests of their employees, e.g., expecting them to do unpaid overtime.

Origin
"Take the piss" may be a reference to a related (and dated) idiomatic expression, piss-proud, which is a vulgar pun referring to the morning erections which happen when a male person awakens at the end of a dream cycle (each about 90 minutes in length throughout the night) or may be caused by a full bladder pressing upon nerves that help effect an erection. This could be considered a "false" erection, as its origin is physiological, not psychosexual, so in a metaphoric sense, then, someone who is "piss-proud" would suffer from false pride, and taking the piss out of them refers to deflating this false pride, through disparagement or mockery. As knowledge of the expression's metaphoric origin became lost on users, "taking the piss out of" came to be synonymous with disparagement or mockery itself, with less regard to the pride of the subject.

Conversely, the North East of England also lays claim to the phrase's origin, citing the urine trade which was seen as an undesirable cargo for sailors working from the River Tyne. Because the city collected urine from public facilities and exported a refined version of it, it was often used as ship's ballast in place of water - having a resale value at the other end of the journey. Consequently, sailors discussing their cargo in local establishments would genially accuse others reputed to be lying about their cargo of "taking the piss", or hauling urine.

"Take the mickey" may be an abbreviated form of the Cockney rhyming slang "take the Mickey Bliss", a euphemism for "take the piss." It has also been suggested that "mickey" is a contraction of "micturition," in which case "take the micturition" would be a synonymous euphemism for "take the piss." The phrase has been noted since the 1930s.

References

English-language idioms
Satire
English-language slang